Streptomyces cahuitamycinicus is a bacterium species from the genus of Streptomyces which has been isolated from soil from the Karakum Desert in Turkmenistan.

See also 
 List of Streptomyces species

References 

cahuitamycinicus
Bacteria described in 2020